Bailey Thomas Cabello May (born 6 August 2002) is a Filipino-British singer, model, actor, dancer, and television personality. He first gained recognition through his Sean Kingston and Daniel Padilla covers. In 2015, he successfully auditioned for the 10th year edition of Pinoy Pig Brother titled  Pinoy Pig Brother: 737, and eventually placed as the third runner-up (4th Teen Big Placer). In 2017, he joined the global pop group Now United, representing the Philippines, but left the group in 2023 to pursue his solo career.

Early life
May was born in Cebu City, Cebu, Philippines to a Cebuana mother, Vanessa May (née Cabello), and a British father, Matthew May. He has a younger sibling named Maya Luiza May. When he was four, his family moved from the Philippines to Norwich, England where he lived until he was twelve. As a result, he holds dual Filipino and British citizenship. His family often returned to the Philippines for holidays and special family gatherings. He attended Notre Dame High School in Norwich.

At the age of twelve, May returned permanently to the Philippines, and later became an official housemate after auditioning online for Pinoy Big Brother: 737.

Acting career
May auditioned as a housemate for Pinoy Big Brother: 737 and successfully entered in 2015. He won as third runner-up (4th Teen Big Placer).

His Pinoy Big Brother appearance paved the way for his entrance into Philippine showbiz landing him his first acting stint in the primetime hit On the Wings of Love playing the role of Harry Fausto the younger cousin of Clark Medina played by James Reid and the love interest of Audrey Olivar played by Ylona Garcia.

Music career

2015–2016: Music career beginnings 
In July 2015, May, together with fellow housemate Ylona Garcia, recorded their own version of "Magmahal Muli" (Lit. To Love Again). The next month, he recorded his own version of "Now We're Together" which was originally sung by Khalil Ramos. On 9 August 2015 both songs were released on Spotify. His self-titled debut album Bailey was released in November 2015.

2017–2023: Now United
In November 2017, May was revealed as part of the final lineup for the global pop group Now United, representing the Philippines, being announced as the 9th member. The group has since embarked on three world tours, Promo World Tour (2018), World Tour 2019 - Presented by YouTube Music, and Dreams Come True Tour (2019), traveling to various cities in countries such as Mexico, India, Brazil, South Korea, the Philippines, and the United States. In 2019, the music video for 'Afraid Of Letting Go' was released by Now United, where May stands out and the lead singer in the song, and where it is shot in Intramuros and some premises in Letran in Manila, Philippines. Also in 2019, Now United released 'Sundin Ang Puso' together with Pepsi, where May sang the chorus in Tagalog with Any Gabrielly, and it was also shot in Manila.

In January 2020, Now United released 'Live This Moment', which include the boys of the group along with May in the music video. Also in 2020, the song and music video for 'Nobody Fools Me Twice' was released, with May's vocals provided in Korean, along with Heyoon Jeong. In the beginning of 2021, the group released the single 'How Far We've Come' where in he's the only male vocalist who sang the song. In the beginning of April 2021, May didn't participated the music videos of 'Show You How To Love' which was filmed in Malibu, California, the live version of 'Let The Music Move You' and 'Nobody Like Us' in Hawaii due to the comeback of its fellow member Lamar Morris. On January 13, 2023 he announced his departure from the group to pursue his solo career. On January 14, Odo was released. This song is the last song with Bailey as a member of Now United.

Filmography

Television

Documentaries

Discography

Albums
 Bailey (2016)

Singles

Awards and nominations

References

External links

Living people
XIX Entertainment artists
Cebuano male child actors
Pinoy Big Brother contestants
Cebuano people of British descent
People from Norwich
People from Cebu City
Male actors from Cebu
Star Magic
ABS-CBN personalities
Star Music artists
2002 births
Now United members
Cebuano male models
21st-century Cebuano male singers